The 2022 Calypso Lemonade 150 was the sixth stock car race of the 2022 ARCA Menards Series season, the fifth race of the 2022 ARCA Menards Series East season, the second race of the 2022 Sioux Chief Showdown, and the 16th iteration of the event. The first part of the race was held on Saturday, June 11, 2022, but because of inclement weather, the rest of the race was held on Sunday, June 12. It was held in Newton, Iowa at Iowa Speedway, a 0.875 mile (1.408 km) permanent oval-shaped racetrack. The race took the scheduled 150 laps to complete. Brandon Jones, driving for Joe Gibbs Racing, took the lead away from Sammy Smith with 18 laps to go, and would earn his 7th career ARCA Menards Series win, his 2nd career ARCA Menards Series East win, and his second win of the season. To fill out the podium, Connor Mosack, driving for Bret Holmes Racing, would finish in 3rd, respectively.

Background 
It has over 25,000 permanent seats as well as a unique multi-tiered RV viewing area along the backstretch.

Entry list 

 (R) denotes rookie driver

Practice 
The only 45-minute practice session was held on Saturday, June 11, at 4:15 PM CST.

Qualifying 
Qualifying was held on Saturday, June 11, at 6:00 PM CST. The qualifying system used is a multi car, one round system. Whoever sets the fastest time in the round wins the pole.

Full qualifying results

Race results

Standings after the race 

Drivers' Championship standings

Note: Only the first 10 positions are included for the driver standings.

References 

2022 ARCA Menards Series
2022 ARCA Menards Series East
NASCAR races at Iowa Speedway
Calypso Lemonade 150
Calypso Lemonade 150